Cory Hahn (born December 11, 1991) is an American former college baseball player. He was paralyzed from the chest down during the third game of his freshman season at Arizona State in 2011. Since then, Cory has won many awards for his endurance and positive attitude, and he was drafted in the 34th round of the 2013 Major League Baseball draft by the Arizona Diamondbacks.

Early life
Corey graduated from the Mater Dei High School in Santa Ana, California in 2010 where he earned four varsity letters and served as the team captain in 2010. He was a First Team All-American and was a member of the 18U Team USA that won the gold medal.

College
He was picked in the 26th round (784th overall) by the San Diego Padres in the 2010 Major League Baseball draft. During the first inning of his third game, he slid head-first into second base and broke his neck. After the injury, he continued with the team, becoming a player-coach. He graduated from Arizona State in May 2014 with a business degree from the W.P. Carey School of Business and is preparing to be a scout with the Arizona Diamondbacks. In preparation for hiring him, the Diamondbacks drafted him in the 34th round to coincide with his number.

Awards and honors
First Team All-League and First Team All-State in 2009
2010 Orange County Player of the Year
2010 Los Angeles Times Player of the Year
Wilma Rudolph Student Athlete Achievement Award in 2013 by The National Association of Academic Advisors for Athletics (N4A)

Family life
His parents, Dale and Christine Hahn, live in Corona, California. Cory has a younger brother, Jason.

External links

References

1991 births
Living people
Baseball players from California
Sportspeople from Santa Ana, California
Arizona State Sun Devils baseball players
People with tetraplegia
American people with disabilities
W. P. Carey School of Business alumni